Yonatan Yosef, is a Jerusalem rabbi, a former spokesman for Jewish settlers in Sheikh Jarrah, and right-wing activist for the Judaization of East Jerusalem. A member of Jerusalem city council since 2018.

In 2013, Yosef ran for Jerusalem City Council. In 2018, he was elected to the city council, being in the second place in "Meuchadim" list headed by Aryeh King, which won two of the 31 seats in the counsil. 
In the 2019 general elections, he was placed 3 in list of Yachad party headed by Eli Yishai, but the party withdrew few days before the election. 

Yosef obtained ownership of a house in part of Sheikh Jarrah in which a Jewish neighborhood existed prior to the 1948 war, and that the Jordanian authorities rented to a family of Palestinian refugees. In 2021 he demanded the eviction of the family, and presonally delivered them the eviction notice.

In reference to Sheikh Jarrah, in the 2012 short film My Neighbourhood, Yosef stated that: "The bible says that this area and this country belong to the Jewish people." "We take house after house because we prove in the court that this area belonged to the Jewish. And because that, all this area will be a Jewish neighbourhood. Our dream is that all East Jerusalem will be like West Jerusalem, Jewish capital of Israel."
In 2023, he was marching in Sheikh Jarrah with a group of supporters, chanting "we want Nakba, Nakba now!" 

He is the son of Rabbi Ya'akov Yosef and the grandson of Ovadia Yosef.

References

Year of birth missing (living people)
20th-century births
Living people
21st-century Israeli politicians
City councillors of Jerusalem
Jewish Israeli politicians
Ovadia Yosef
Sephardic Haredi rabbis in Israel